Melker Karlsson (born 18 July 1990), nicknamed The Melkman, is a Swedish professional ice hockey winger who is currently playing for Skellefteå AIK of the Swedish Hockey League (SHL). He previously played for the San Jose Sharks of the National Hockey League (NHL). During Karlsson's first tenure with Skellefteå AIK, he was a two-time Le Mat Trophy champion, winning the Swedish Championship in 2013 and 2014.

Playing career
On 30 May 2014, Karlsson signed a one-year contract with the San Jose Sharks.

After beginning the subsequent season with the Worcester Sharks of the American Hockey League, on 9 December 2014, it was announced that Karlsson would make his NHL debut that night in a game against the Edmonton Oilers. Karlsson scored his first NHL goal on 22 December 2014, against Frederik Andersen of the Anaheim Ducks.

On 12 May 2017, it was announced the Sharks had re-signed Karlsson to a three-year, $6 million contract.

As a free agent from the Sharks after six-seasons with the club, Karlsson remained un-signed into the 2020–21 season, as the North American season was delayed due to the COVID-19 pandemic. On 15 December 2020, Karlsson opted to remain in his native Sweden, returning to his original club, Skellefteå AIK of the SHL, for the remainder of the season.

Career statistics

References

External links

1990 births
Living people
Örebro HK players
People from Lycksele Municipality
San Jose Barracuda players
San Jose Sharks players
Skellefteå AIK players
Swedish expatriate ice hockey players in the United States
Swedish ice hockey right wingers
Undrafted National Hockey League players
Worcester Sharks players
Sportspeople from Västerbotten County